NHY may refer to:

 New Hey railway station, England (National Rail station code)
 New York and Oslo Stock Exchange symbols for Norsk Hydro